Events in the year 1960 in the Republic of India.(post Independence period)

7 May 1960 Border Road Organization (BRO) was established.

Incumbents
 President of India – Rajendra Prasad
 Prime Minister of India – Jawaharlal Nehru
 Vice President of India - Sarvepalli Radhakrishnan
 Chief Justice of India – Bhuvaneshwar Prasad Sinha

Governors
 Andhra Pradesh – Bhim Sen Sachar 
 Assam – Saiyid Fazal Ali (until 12 November), Vishnu Sahay (starting 12 November)
 Bihar – Zakir Hussain 
 Gujarat – Mehdi Nawaz Jung (starting 1 May)
 Karnataka – Jayachamarajendra Wadiyar 
 Kerala – Burgula Ramakrishna Rao (until 1 July), V. V. Giri (starting 1 July) 
 Madhya Pradesh – Hari Vinayak Pataskar
 Maharashtra – Sri Prakasa
 Odisha – Yeshwant Narayan Sukthankar 
 Punjab – Narahar Vishnu Gadgil 
 Rajasthan – Gurumukh Nihal Singh 
 Uttar Pradesh – Varahgiri Venkat Giri (until 1 July), Kanhaiyalal Maneklal Munshi (starting 1 July)
 West Bengal – Padmaja Naidu

Events
 National income - 176,333 million
 1 May – In India, 1 May is declared as 'Maharashtra Divas', i.e., Maharashtra Day (the same day is also celebrated as 'Kaamgaar Divas', i.e., Workers Day) or 'Gujarat Diwas'.
 1 May – Yashwantrao Chavan took oath as the 1st Chief Minister of Maharashtra
 20 June – Maharashtra State Electricity Board formed.
 The ninth amendments of the Constitution of India
 Air India enters United States with flights to New York.
 Bajaj Auto goes public.
 Goa, Diu and Daman were freed from Portuguese rule and became parts of the Indian federation.

Law
 1 May – Gujarat State and Maharashtra State are formed from the State of Bombay as laid down by the States Reorganisation Act.

Births
2 January – Raman Lamba, cricketer (died 1998)
5 February – Maganti Venkateswara Rao, politician and member of parliament from Eluru.
1 May – Y. V. Subba Reddy, politician from YSR Congress Party and former member of parliament from Ongole.
21 May  Mohanlal, actor.
10 June  Nandamuri Balakrishna, actor and politician.
25 June – Suresh Gopi, actor.
11 July – Kumar Gaurav, actor.
27 July  Poornima Bhagyaraj, actress. 
12 September  Vadivelu, actor and comedian.
13 September – Karthik, actor.

Deaths
30 January – J. C. Kumarappa, economist (born 1892).
2 February – Jagadguru Swami Sri Bharati Krishna Tirthaji Maharaja, Hindu teacher (born 1884).
20 April – Pannalal Ghosh, flute (bānsurī) player and composer (born 1911).
27 April – Rajshekhar Basu, writer, chemist and lexicographer (born 1880).

See also 
 Bollywood films of 1960

 
India
Years of the 20th century in India